Thomas William Horsfall (born 7 January 1951 in Hamilton, South Lanarkshire) is a Scottish former footballer.

Playing career

Southend United
Horsfall spent two years at Southend United but was unable to hold down a regular first team spot.

Scunthorpe
While on loan at Scunthorpe Horsfall scored twice in his debut however did not score again in his five-game stint.

Cambridge United
In 1974 Horsfall signed for Cambridge United where he played 83 matches from 1974 to 1977.

References

1951 births
Scottish footballers
Southend United F.C. players
Bury F.C. players
Scunthorpe United F.C. players
Cambridge United F.C. players
Halifax Town A.F.C. players
Living people
Dover F.C. players
Association football midfielders